During the 1994–95 English football season, Barnsley F.C. competed in the Football League First Division.

Season summary
In the 1994–95 season, the Tykes finished sixth in the First Division. In an ordinary season this would have meant occupying a playoff place, but due to the Premier League reducing from 22 to 20 clubs, only two teams would be promoted (with fifth placed club occupying the final playoff place) and Barnsley missed out.

Final league table

Results
Barnsley's score comes first

Legend

Football League First Division

FA Cup

League Cup

Squad

References

Barnsley F.C. seasons
Barnsley